Mush is a browser-based free-to-play multiplayer game by the French company Motion Twin. The game was first available in French on 14 January 2013. From August 2013, the English version of the game was in closed beta phase, which ended before 5 November 2013 when the game went live.

The plot of the game, wherein an alien entity (the titular "Mush") takes over some of the 16 people on a spaceship and the players attempt to uncover their identities, has been compared to John Carpenter's 1982 film The Thing.

Plot and Gameplay
Players choose from a roster of characters, each with specified roles and skills (such as chef, pilot, scientist, etc.) and must work together with fifteen other players to attend to various tasks on the spacecraft Daedalus. Two of these players are infected with the "Mush", a malevolent alien pathogen. The goal of the Mush players is to covertly conquer and infect the rest of the ship, or slay every living human.
Each player is allotted action points and movement points which are recharged every "cycle" (three hours of real time). There are life points and moral points too. If one of these reaches 0, the player dies.

The graphics utilize pixel art and isometric projection.

Reception
Mush was awarded the Originality Award at 2013’s European Indie Game Days.

References

External links
 Official website 
 Official website 
 

2013 video games
Browser games
Browser-based multiplayer online games
Free-to-play video games
Space MOGs
Video games developed in France
Motion Twin games